In information theory, the Rényi entropy is a quantity that generalizes various notions of entropy, including Hartley entropy, Shannon entropy, collision entropy, and min-entropy. The Rényi entropy is named after Alfréd Rényi, who looked for the most general way to quantify information while preserving additivity for independent events. In the context of fractal dimension estimation, the Rényi entropy forms the basis of the concept of generalized dimensions.

The Rényi entropy is important in ecology and statistics as index of diversity.  The Rényi entropy is also important in quantum information, where it can be used as a measure of entanglement.  In the Heisenberg XY spin chain model, the Rényi entropy as a function of  can be calculated explicitly because it is an automorphic function with respect to a particular subgroup of the modular group.  In theoretical computer science, the min-entropy is used in the context of randomness extractors.

Definition 

 .

The logarithm is conventionally taken to be base 2, especially in the context of information theory where bits are used.

Applications often exploit the following relation between the Rényi entropy and the p-norm of the vector of probabilities:
 .

The Rényi entropy for any  is Schur concave.

Special cases 

As   approaches zero, the Rényi entropy increasingly weighs all events with nonzero probability more equally, regardless of their probabilities. The limit for   → 1 is the Shannon entropy. As   approaches infinity, the Rényi entropy is increasingly determined by the events of highest probability.

Hartley or max-entropy 

Shannon entropy 

Collision entropy 
Collision entropy, sometimes just called "Rényi entropy", refers to the case  = 2,

The collision entropy is related to the index of coincidence.

Min-entropy 

Equivalently, the min-entropy  is the largest real number   such that all events occur with probability at most .

The name min-entropy stems from the fact that it is the smallest entropy measure in the family of Rényi entropies.
In this sense, it is the strongest way to measure the information content of a discrete random variable.
In particular, the min-entropy is never larger than the Shannon entropy.

The min-entropy has important applications for randomness extractors in theoretical computer science:
Extractors are able to extract randomness from random sources that have a large min-entropy; merely having a large Shannon entropy does not suffice for this task.

Inequalities for different orders α 
which can be proven by differentiation, as

which is proportional to Kullback–Leibler divergence (which is always non-negative), where
.

In particular cases inequalities can be proven also by Jensen's inequality:

In particular, we have

On the other hand, the Shannon entropy  can be arbitrarily high for a random variable  that has a given min-entropy. An example of this is given by the sequence of random variables  for  such that  and  since  but .

Rényi divergence 
As well as the absolute Rényi entropies, Rényi also defined a spectrum of divergence measures generalising the Kullback–Leibler divergence.

The Rényi divergence of order  or alpha-divergence of a distribution  from a distribution  is defined to be

We can define the Rényi divergence for the special values  by taking a limit, and in particular the limit  gives the Kullback–Leibler divergence.

Some special cases:

 : minus the log probability under  that ;

 : minus twice the logarithm of the Bhattacharyya coefficient;

 : the Kullback–Leibler divergence;

 : the log of the expected ratio of the probabilities;

 : the log of the maximum ratio of the probabilities.

The Rényi divergence is indeed a divergence, meaning simply that  is greater than or equal to zero, and zero only when .

Financial interpretation 

A pair of probability distributions can be viewed as a game of chance in which one of the distributions defines official odds and the other contains the actual probabilities. Knowledge of the actual probabilities allows a player to profit from the game. The expected profit rate is connected to the Rényi divergence as follows

Why α = 1 is special 
The value , which gives the Shannon entropy and the Kullback–Leibler divergence, is special because it is only at  that the chain rule of conditional probability holds exactly:

for the absolute entropies, and

for the relative entropies.

and

The stronger properties of the  quantities, which allow the definition of conditional information and mutual information from communication theory, may be very important in other applications, or entirely unimportant, depending on those applications' requirements.

Exponential families 
The Rényi entropies and divergences for an exponential family admit simple expressions

and 

where 

is a Jensen difference divergence.

Physical meaning 

The Rényi entropy in quantum physics is not considered to be an observable, due to its nonlinear dependence on the density matrix.  (This nonlinear dependence applies even in the special case of the Shannon entropy.)  It can, however, be given an operational meaning through the two-time measurements (also known as full counting statistics) of energy transfers.

See also
 Diversity indices
 Tsallis entropy
 Generalized entropy index

Notes

References 

 
 
 
 
 
 
 
 
 
 
 
 
 
 
 
 
 
 
 
 

Information theory
Entropy and information